Europa is a steel-hulled barque registered in the Netherlands. Originally she was a German lightship, named Senator Brockes and built in 1911 at the H.C. Stülcken & Sohn shipyard in Hamburg, Germany. Until 1977, she was in use by the German Federal Coast Guard as a lightship on the river Elbe. A Dutchman bought the vessel (or what was left of her) in 1985 and in 1994 she was fully restored as a barque, a three-mast rigged vessel, and retrofitted for special-purpose sail-training.

Europa cruises worldwide and accepts paying voyage crew (trainees) for short or long trip segments, including ocean crossings, Sail Training Association races, and annual voyages to Antarctica, and between South Georgia, Tristan da Cunha, and Cape Town.

In 2002 and 2013 she rounded Cape Horn. In 2010 she participated in Velas Sudamerica 2010, an historical Latin American tour by eleven tall ships to celebrate the bicentennial of the first national governments of Argentina and Chile.

In 2013-2014 Europa  circumnavigated the world together with two other Dutch tall ships, Tecla and Oosterschelde. They sailed from South Africa to Mauritius, Australia and New Zealand. In October 2013 Europa participated in the International Fleet Review 2013 in Sydney. From New Zealand, the ship sailed an official Cape Horn rounding (October - December 2013). In June 2014 Europa completed her circumnavigation by arriving in Amsterdam.

Gallery

References 
 Also the Europa set sail to Melbourne, Australia and Arrived in September 1852.

External links 
 
 Feuerschiff Senator Brockes 
 Ship details at Bureau Veritas

Individual sailing vessels
Barques
Tall ships of the Netherlands
1911 ships